Oleo is an album by multi-instrumentalist and composer Joe McPhee, recorded in 1982 and first released on the  Swiss HatHut label in 1983 it was rereleased on CD in 1992 as Oleo & A Future Retrospective with bonus tracks recorded later that evening.

Reception

Allmusic reviewer Brian Olewnick states "It remains not only a wonderful session in its own right but also one of the more approachable entries into this superior musician's realm. Highly recommended".
All About Jazz writer Clifford Allen said "McPhee has hit on a central concept in jazz and improvised music with his engagement of lateral thinking. Improvisation, for it to be successful, must occur on an equal level between participants, a conversation in one room, at one table, even if the plates and silverware differ. The fact that this session is somewhat hit-or-miss does not defer from the notion of Po Music, for ebb and flow must include failures as well as successes".

Track listing 
All compositions by Joe McPhee except as indicated
 "Oleo" [Take 1] (Sonny Rollins) - 5:25
 "Pablo" - 8:54
 "Future Retrospective" - 7:00
 "Astral Spirits" - 7:12
 "Oleo" [Take 2] (Rollins) - 4:37
 "I Remember Clifford" (Benny Golson) - 3:26
 "Ann Kahlé" - 5:41
 "When You Hear Music" - 8:13 Bonus track on CD reissue
 "After It's Over" - 7:40 Bonus track on CD reissue
 "It's Gone In the Air" - 11:51 Bonus track on CD reissue
 "You Can Never Capture It Again" - 7:43 Bonus track on CD reissue

Personnel 
Joe McPhee - tenor saxophone, cornet
André Jaume - clarinet, bass clarinet, alto saxophone 
Raymond Boni - guitar
François Mechali - bass (tracks 1-7)

References 

Joe McPhee albums
1983 albums
Hathut Records albums